Kalasur (also Romanized as Kalāsūr, Kalasoor, and Kelāsūr; also known as Keyālīsūr, Kialiasur, and Kyalyasur) is a village in Misheh Pareh Rural District, in the Central District of Kaleybar County, East Azerbaijan Province, Iran. At the 2006 census, its population was 108, in 22 families.

References 

Populated places in Kaleybar County